Gary Styczynski is a professional poker player of Polish American descent.

He won a World Series of Poker bracelet in the $1,500 Limit Poker Hold'em event in 2007.

He is married and has two children.  When he won his bracelet he was 42 years old.

As of 2007, Gary Styczynki has tournament winnings in excess of $309,844.

World Series of Poker bracelets
Gary is of Polish-American descent

References

American poker players
World Series of Poker bracelet winners
Living people
Year of birth missing (living people)